Dev S/O Mudde Gowda is a 2012 Kannada romantic comedy film loosely inspired by the Bollywood film Wake Up Sid. It stars Diganth and Charmee Kaur. Ananth Nag plays a prominent supporting role while the model-turned-actress Nathalia Kaur makes a special appearance. The film is directed and written by Indrajith Lankesh. Jassie Gift is the music director; Dharma Vish scored the background music and two songs which can be seen only in the movie. Shilpa Ramesh is the producer. Award-winning cinematographer Santosh Rai Pathaje is associated with this film as the camera man. It openrf across cinema halls on 6 April 2012.

Cast 
 Diganth as Dev
 Charmee Kaur as Kavya
 Ananth Nag as Mudde Gowda
 Sudha Belawadi
 Sharan
 Raju Thalikote
 Tabla Nani
 Swayamvara Chandru
 Mithra
 Indrajith Lankesh as Deepu (special appearance)
 Nathalia Kaur as item number

Title controversy 
Karnataka Vokkaligara Okkoota alleged that the title Dev, Son of Mudde Gowda is defaming the Vokkaliga community and former Prime Minister H.D. Deve Gowda. Further the association went on to say that "it is a deliberate humiliation to the community and its staple food ‘ragi ball’ (Mudde)." They also alleged that some posters of the movie were derogatory.

Soundtrack

Reception

Critical response 

A critic from The Times of India scored the film at 3.5 out of 5 stars and says "While Diganth is at his best, Charmie charms you with her expressions and dialogue delivery. Sharan shines too. While Santhosh Pataje’s cinematography is impressive, music director Jessie Gift has given a couple of foot-tapping numbers". Srikanth Srinivasa from Rediff.com scored the film at 2 out of 5 stars and says "The songs are choreographed and picturised well. Jassie Gift has scored some foot-tapping numbers. Santosh Pathaje's camerawork is adequate. The film is worth watching for its light-hearted comedy". Atul Chaturvedi from Bangalore Mirror wrote "The director’s intention of showcasing everything in rich colours accompanied by camerawork makes the film pleasing to the eyes. Charmee, it looks like, is ready to play the aunt on the small screen. Her liveliness covers up for the extra pounds. Dev S/o Mudde Gowda is a safe bet. Enjoy the mellowness". A critic from News18 India wrote "Jessie Gift's music is the highlight of the film. "Dil se" song is well picturised also. Santhosh Kumar Pathaaje's camera work adds up to the richness of the film. The editing work is also perfect". SV from Deccan Herald wrote " Go with blinkers tightly on your expectations and Dev, which is dud as a dodo, is sure to tickle your funnybones. Ananth Nag, Diganth and Charmi weave their charm on their fans with ease and elan. Enjoy maadi". Y Maheswara Reddy from DNA wrote "However, Dev S/O Muddegowda has its fair share of glamour, entertainment, comedy and loads of sentiment and that makes it a worthwhile watch".

References

2012 films
2010s Kannada-language films
Films directed by Indrajit Lankesh